Wolfheart is the debut studio album by Portuguese gothic metal band Moonspell. All of the tracks are in English except for "Trebaruna" and "Ataegina", which are in Portuguese, as well as the chorus of "Alma Mater". The song "An Erotic Alchemy" is a duet, inspired by and quoting Marquis de Sade.

In July 2010, it was reported that Wolfheart will be represented in the form of an official stamp to be issued by the Portuguese Postal Service (CTT, Correios de Portugal) as part of a collection of stamps that represent the most significant rock moments and records from Portugal.

Track listing 
All lyrics by Fernando Ribeiro, all music by Moonspell.

Credits

Band members 
 Fernando Ribeiro (Langsuyar) – lead vocals
 Duarte Picoto (Mantus) – guitars
 João Pereira (Tanngrisnir) – guitars, backing vocals
 João Pedro Escoval (Ares) – bass
 Pedro Paixão (Passionis) – keyboards, backing vocals
 Miguel Gaspar (Mike) – drums

Additional musicians 
 Birgit Zacher – female vocals

Production 
 Nuno Cartaxo – photography
 Christophe Szpajdel – logo (original edition)
 Axel Hermann – cover art (original edition)
 Carsten Drescher – layout, design

References

Moonspell albums
1995 debut albums
Century Media Records albums
Albums produced by Waldemar Sorychta